Wales (West and North) Television, known on screen as  (Welsh for "Wales Television") and often abbreviated to WWN, was the Welsh "Independent Television" (commercial television) contractor awarded the franchise area serving North and West Wales, from 1962 (franchise awarded 6 June 1961). It began transmitting on 14 September 1962, and ceased on 26 January 1964 through financial failure; the franchise area was soon combined with the South Wales and West of England area, operated by TWW. TWW retained the Teledu Cymru name in the former WWN franchise area, as did successor Harlech during their emergency transitional franchise, only retiring the name when they were able to officially take over.

History
The geography of Wales presented a daunting problem to the Independent Television Authority (ITA). The populous area of Wales in the South were already being served by TWW, which had begun broadcasting in 1958, while the north-east of the country and much of the north coast was served by the North of England weekday and weekend franchise holders, Granada and ABC, operating since 1956; the interior of north Wales could not receive ITV transmissions at all.

The ITA was pressured, by a consortium of Welsh-speaking businessmen, into setting up a new North and West Wales region; the ITA asked the Postmaster General to allow this, which he did, with strict provisos: the new service must not offer viewers in Wales a choice other viewers did not have, and at the last minute, the Postmaster General insisted that the new station should, on its own, produce ten-hours-a-week of programmes in Welsh, without relying on Welsh language programmes produced by Granada (and ABC) and TWW.

These punitive regulations were accepted, and the contract was awarded in 1961 to Wales Television Limited, which was later changed to Wales (West and North) Television Limited, following objections from TWW who felt that the original name was intruding on their area, though WWN dropped the parenthesis at every possible opportunity. WWN was to use three VHF transmitters, at Preseli (covering the south west), Arfon (north west) and Moel-y-Parc in the north east. When the Preseli transmitter came online on 14 September 1962, so did WWN, making it the 17th and last of the original ITA franchises to launch.  However, the delay in introducing the transmitters at Arfon and Moel-y-Parc, until later in 1963, destroyed the morale and the finances of WWN. Free programming from the ITV network, plus other support from its neighbours ABC, ATV and TWW just about kept the ship afloat, but Manchester's Granada Television decided to dispense with its productions in the Welsh language, and the loss of this valuable programming stream proved fatal to WWN.

TWW offered a generous package to WWN's shareholders, in order to gain control of the territory, and kept the Teledu Cymru name on the air for four years after the demise of its parent company on 26 January 1964. TWW successor Harlech also retained the Teledu Cymru name when TWW's early termination of service forced them to run an emergency transitional franchise, only retiring the name when their franchise began properly.

Studios
WWN's studio complex was located in Western Avenue, Cardiff, despite the fact that this area was not served by WWN but by their rivals TWW. It was from here their programmes were made and their headquarters were. The company did, however, have a regional office and news studio in the region located in Bangor. Following the acquisition of WWN by TWW, the Western Avenue base was closed, with all operations moved to TWW's Pontcanna base, also in Cardiff. To accommodate the addition Teledu Cymru presentation, the Pontcanna studios received a large upgrade. It is believed that the Bangor base was retained by TWW. The studios on Western Avenue were eventually demolished and replaced by the new headquarters for the WJEC examining board.

Identity
WWN's on screen identity featured a stylised dragon against a black background with the 'Teledu Cymru' name beneath. This ident, it is believed, was the only one used by the station, whose existence was very short. Following the takeover from TWW however, the ident was modified. The dragon emblem was retained, as was the Teledu Cymru name, with the only addition being a caption below with TWW's logo and a legend stating 'Network for Wales'. The ident also now animated on screen in sections to the tune of TWW's ident. Following TWW's loss of contract, the Teledu Cymru name was once again utilised by the Independent Television Service for Wales and the West that ran the franchise until HTV could begin broadcasting.

See also
 TWW
 Independent Television Service for Wales and the West
 HTV
 ITV
 History of ITV

References

External links 
Harlech House of Graphics (unofficial fan site)
Television Wales and the West at TV Live
TWW at TVARK

ITV franchisees
Television channels in Wales
Television channels and stations established in 1962
1964 disestablishments in Wales
Television channels and stations disestablished in 1964
1962 establishments in Wales